Joshua "Josh" Coppins (born 11 March 1977) is a New Zealand former professional motocross rider. He competed in the Motocross World Championships from 1993 to 2012. Coppins posted four top three results during his career including a second place in the 2002 250cc motocross world championship and a second place in the MX1 world championship.

Motocross racing career
Coppins was born in Motueka, New Zealand. He began his international racing career in 1996 as a privateer. Coppins was runner up to Mickaël Pichon in the 2002 F.I.M. 250cc motocross world championship riding a Honda. In 2005, still on a Honda, he finished second to Stefan Everts in the MX1-GP championship for 450cc four-stroke machines. He has represented New Zealand in the Motocross des Nations since 1997.

During the 2007 FIM Motocross World Championship, Coppins built a 100-point lead in the championship, only to break his shoulder blade in the 12th round forcing him out of the next 3 rounds and ending his title hopes. Coppins retired from full-time racing in 2012.

Career results

 2009: 6th MX1 World Championship, winner of 1 GP
 2008: 5th MX1 World Championship, winner of 1 GP
 2007: 3rd MX1 World Championship, winner of 5 GP's
 2006: 7th MX1 World Championship, winner of 1 GP
 2005: 2nd MX1 World Championship, winner of 2 GP's
 2004: 3rd MX1 World Championship, winner of 1 GP
 2003: 11th MX1 World Championship
 2002: 2nd 250cc World Championship
 2001: 6th 250cc World Championship
 2000: 4th 250cc World Championship
 1999: 7th 250cc World Championship

References

External links 
 Joshua Coppins home page
 Joshua Coppins racing bio at the Yamaha Racing web site

1977 births
Living people
New Zealand motocross riders
People from Motueka